Kalyvia Ilidos is a village in the northern part of the municipal unit of Amaliada, Elis, Greece. It is located near the left bank of the river Pineios, 1 km northeast of Avgeio, 1 km west of Archaia Ilida (ancient Elis), 10 km north of Amaliada and 11 km northeast of Gastouni.

Historical population

See also
List of settlements in Elis

External links
Kalyvia (in Greek)

References

Populated places in Elis